Madeleine of France  may refer to:
Magdalena of France, daughter of Charles VII of France, mother of two monarchs of Navarre
Madeleine of France, daughter of Francis I of France, Queen of Scots